The Tamá harlequin frog or Venezuela stubfoot toad (Atelopus tamaense) is a species of toad in the family Bufonidae. It is endemic to the Páramo de Tamá on the Venezuelan-Colombian border and occurs in Apure and (likely) Táchira states of Venezuela and Norte de Santander Department on the Cordillera Oriental of Colombia.

The species occurs in the Tamá National Natural Park in Colombia and El Tamá National Park in Venezuela. The habitat could be affected by fire. Its major threat, however, is chytridiomycosis that has negatively impacted many other montane Atelopus species.

References

tamaense
Amphibians of the Andes
Amphibians of Colombia
Amphibians of Venezuela
Amphibians described in 1990
Taxonomy articles created by Polbot